Indy, short for I'm not dead yet, is a gene found in the fruit fly Drosophila melanogaster, an important model organism. Mutant versions of this gene have doubled the average life span of fruit flies in at least one set of experiments, but this result has been subject to controversy. Both Indy proteins are sodium sulfate symporters. Its name originates from a well-known comic line in Monty Python and the Holy Grail.

Reduced expression of this gene in Drosophila melanogaster flies and C. elegans worms modeled the effects on obesity and diabetes of caloric reduction in primates such as humans. A similar effect was seen with SLC13A5 (mIndy) knockouts of mice.

See also 
Cell biology

References

External links 
 Indy at FlyBase database of Drosophila genes.

Drosophila melanogaster genes
Monty Python and the Holy Grail